Baguinéda-Camp is a small town and rural commune in the Cercle of Kati in the Koulikoro Region of southern Mali. The commune contains 32 villages and in the 2009 census had a population of 58,661. The town lies to the south of the Niger River.

References

External links
.

Communes of Koulikoro Region
Communities on the Niger River